The 2006 congressional elections in Arizona were elections for Arizona's delegation to the United States House of Representatives, which occurred along with congressional elections nationwide on November 7, 2006. Arizona has eight seats, as apportioned during the 2000 United States Census. Prior to the election, Republicans held six of the eight seats and Democrats held two. In the 8th district, Republican Congressman Jim Kolbe retired, leaving an open seat. Following the elections, Democrats gained two seats at the expense of the Republicans, who lost two.

Overview

District 1

The normally Republican 1st district, based in the region north of Phoenix and Tucson and one of the largest districts by land area in the country, had been represented by Republican Rick Renzi since his initial election in 2002. Renzi faced ethical problems in this election and was named by Citizens for Responsibility and Ethics in Washington as one of the most corrupt candidates running for office that year.

Primary

Candidates
 Mike Caccioppoli, former radio correspondent
 Bob Donahue, businessman
 Susan Friedman, marketing director
 Vic McKerlie, dentist
 Rick Renzi, incumbent U.S. Representative
 Ellen Simon, attorney and activist
 David Schlosser, public relations manager

Results

General election

Candidates
 Rick Renzi (Republican), incumbent U.S. Representative
 Ellen Simon (Democratic), attorney and activist
 David Schlosser (Libertarian), public relations manager

Campaign
Attorney and community activist Ellen Simon emerged as the Democratic nominee, and though she initially trailed Renzi by wide margins she made up much a large amount of ground and closed the gap, causing many to consider the race competitive. Simon challenged Renzi to a series of eight debates, to which Renzi responded by attacking Simon's husband for being behind on child support payments to his ex-wife. Ultimately, Renzi won re-election by an eight-point margin.

Endorsements

Results

District 2

The heavily conservative and gerrymandered District 2, which owed its strange shape to the decision to not have Hopi and Navajo Native Americans represented by the same congressman due to historic tensions between them, had been represented by Republican Trent Franks since his initial election in 2002. Franks had been re-elected comfortably in the intervening years due to the conservative nature of the Phoenix suburbs that the district pulled from. He faced Democratic challenger John Thrasher, a music teacher who based his campaign around anti-corruption and immigration reform. Franks comfortably won re-election, albeit by a smaller margin than usual.

Primary

Candidates
 Suchindran Chatterjee (Democratic), engineer and educator
 Trent Franks (Republican), incumbent U,.S. Representative
 Powell Gamill (Libertarian), molecular biologist
 Gene Scharer (Democratic), educator
 John Thrasher (Democratic), educator

Results

General election

Candidates
 Trent Franks (Republican), incumbent U,.S. Representative
 John Thrasher (Democratic), educator
 Powell Gamill (Libertarian), molecular biologist
 William Crum (Write-in), blogger

Results

District 3

The staunchly conservative 3rd district, based in the northern portion of Phoenix and its northern suburbs, had been represented by incumbent Republican John Shadegg since his initial election in 1994. In 2006, Shadegg faced Democratic nominee Herb Paine, a consultant, in the general election. True to the district’s conservative nature, Shadegg defeated Paine by a wide margin, though it was significantly reduced from his 2004 margin.

Primary

Candidates
 Don Chilton (Democratic), retired engineer
 Jim McCoy (Democratic)
 Herb Paine (Democratic), consultant
 John Shadegg (Republican), incumbent U.S. Representative
 Mark Yannone (Libertarian), businessman

Results

General election

Candidates
 John Shadegg (Republican), incumbent U.S. Representative
 Herb Paine (Democratic), consultant
 Mark Yannone (Libertarian), businessman

Results

District 4

The heavily liberal 4th district, based in the southern portion of Phoenix and its southern suburbs, had a high Hispanic-American population. Incumbent Democrat Ed Pastor had represented this portion of the state since a special election in 1991 to replace Mo Udall. In 2006, Pastor faced Republican Don Karg, an aerospace executive, and Ronald Harders, a Libertarian write-in candidate.

Primary

General election

Candidates
 Ed Pastor (Democratic), incumbent U.S. Representative
 Don Karg (Republican), aerospace executive
 Ronald Harders (Libertarian)

Results

District 5

The conservative-leaning 5th district included a small portion of Phoenix and many of its northeastern suburbs, such as Scottsdale and Tempe. Republican J. D. Hayworth had represented the area since his initial election in 1994 and many considered him to be vulnerable to a Democratic challenger. Harry Mitchell, a former Mayor of Tempe, State Senator, and Chairman of the Democratic Party of Arizona, emerged as the Democrats' leading challenger to Hayworth. The race was close for much of the fall, and Mitchell ultimately edged out Hayworth on election day by a four-point margin and was elected to his first term in Congress.

Primary

General election

Candidates
 J. D. Hayworth (Republican), incumbent U.S. Representative
 Harry Mitchell (Democratic), chair of the Democratic Party of Arizona; former state senator
 Warren Severin (Libertarian), businessman

Results

District 6

The heavily conservative 6th district, based in the eastern suburbs of Phoenix, had been represented by Republican Congressman Jeff Flake since his initial election in 2000. Flake built up a repertoire in Congress as being a staunch fiscal conservative and an anti-earmark advocate. Flake faced no Democratic opponent and was overwhelmingly re-elected to his fourth term in Congress over Libertarian candidate Jason Blair.

Primary

General election

Candidates
 Jeff Flake (Republican), incumbent U.S. Representative
 Jason M. Blair (Libertarian)

Results

District 7

The heavily Democratic 7th district, based in southwestern Arizona and covering much of the state’s border with Mexico, had a majority Hispanic-American population and had been represented by Democratic Congressman Raúl Grijalva since 2003. Grijalva faced the former Mayor of Avondale, Republican Ron Drake, and Libertarian write-in candidate Joe Cobb. Grijalva defeated both Drake and Cobb by a comfortable margin.

Primary

Candidates
 Joe Cobb (Libertarian), political advisor and economic instructor
 Ron Drake (Republican), former mayor of Avondale
 Raúl Grijalva (Democratic), incumbent U.S. Representative
 Joseph Sweeney, perennial candidate

Results

General election

Candidates
 Raúl Grijalva (Democratic), incumbent U.S. Representative
 Ron Drake (Republican), former mayor of Avondale
 Joe Cobb (Libertarian), political advisor and economic instructor

Results

District 8

Long-serving Republican Congressman Jim Kolbe, a respected moderate and an openly gay man, declined to seek a seventh term in Congress and thus created an open seat. The marginally conservative 8th district, based in southeastern Arizona, had narrowly supported George W. Bush in 2000 and 2004 and the election was considered to be competitive. Former State Representative Randy Graf, who was heavily conservative and had challenged Kolbe in the Republican primary in 2004, defeated the more moderate Steve Huffman, a state representative, in the open primary, in spite of ad buys in favor of Huffman by national Republicans. Former State Senator Gabby Giffords, a moderate Democrat, triumphed against several Democrats, the most notable of which was television anchor Patty Weiss, in the open primary, and thus she and Graf faced off against each other in the general election. Giffords was the tentative favorite for most of the election, as many moderates were turned off by Graf’s conservative views and Kolbe did not endorse him as the Republican candidate. On election day, Giffords emerged victorious over Graf by a comfortable twelve-point margin and won her first term in Congress.

Primary

Candidates
 Frank Antenori, U.S. Army veteran
 Gabby Giffords, former state senator
 Randy Graf, former state representative
 Mike Hellon, former chair of the Arizona Republican Party
 Steve Huffman, state representative
 Michael T. Jenkins, automobile repair shop owner
 William Daniel Johnson, white nationalist activist
 Jeffrey Lynn Latas, U.S. Air Force veteran
 David F. Nolan, co-founder of the Libertarian Party
 Patty Weiss, television anchor
 Alex Rodriguez, member of the Tucson Unified School District board
 Francine Shacter, former Democratic precinct chairwoman

Endorsements

Results

General election

Candidates
 Gabby Giffords (Democratic), former state senator
 Randy Graf (Republican), former state representative
 David F. Nolan (Libertarian), co-founder of the Libertarian Party
 Jay Quick (Independent), geologist and businessman
 Russ Dove (Write-in), militiaman; campaign manager for William Daniel Johnson
 Leo F. Kimminau (Write-in)
 Paul Price (Write-in)

Results

References

2006
United States House of Representatives
Arizona